The Illinois Eye-Bank is a charitable, not-for-profit organization. Its mission is the preservation and restoration of sight through transplantation, research, education and partnership. It is a subsidiary of Midwest Eye-Banks, and operates two eye bank facilities: one in Chicago, founded in 1947, and one in Bloomington, Illinois founded in 1952.

The Eye-Bank recovers donated eye tissue, with consent, for the purposes of corneal transplantation, scleral implantation, vision research and training. Its mission is supported by volunteer efforts and charitable contributions, as well as fees to help cover the costs incurred in the provision of eye tissue recovery, evaluation and distribution services.

The Illinois Eye-Bank is accredited by the Eye Bank Association of America (EBAA), and operates in compliance with EBAA Medical Standards and U.S. Food and Drug Administration (FDA) regulations.

References

External links 

 https://web.archive.org/web/20070411095919/http://www.illinoiseyebank.org/ - home page
 http://www.restoresight.org/ - Eye Bank Association of America

Healthcare in Chicago